Novoikhsanovo (Yañı İxsan) is a rural locality (a selo) in Chekmagushevsky District, Bashkortostan, Russia. The population was 138 as of 2010. There are 3 streets.

Geography 
Novoikhsanovo is located 24 km southeast of Chekmagush (the district's administrative centre) by road. Kinderkulevo is the nearest rural locality.

References 

Rural localities in Chekmagushevsky District